The Rousseau Range is a small mountain range in southeastern Alaska, United States, located just north of the Peabody Mountains. It has an area of 264 km2 and is a subrange of the Boundary Ranges which in turn form part of the Coast Mountains. The range is located entirely within Misty Fjords National Monument.

It was possibly named for General Lovell H. Rousseau, who accepted the territory of Alaska for the United States in 1867, in a ceremony with Russian representatives at Sitka.

It is near Halibut Bay, Tombstone Bay, Astronomical Point, Blunt Point, Breezy Point, Halibut Point, Petrel Point, River Point, Steep Point, Turn Point and other notable geographic wonders.

See also
List of mountain ranges

References

Boundary Ranges
Mountains of Ketchikan Gateway Borough, Alaska